Lete  is a village development committee in Mustang District in the Dhawalagiri Zone of northern Nepal. At the time of the 1991 Nepal census it had a population of 914 people living in 189 individual households. It is a scenic village surrounded by Dhawalagiri, Annapurna and Nilgiri. This village is governed by chairman the, Ama-Samuha, and other members.

References

External links
UN map of the municipalities of Mustang District

Populated places in Mustang District